Rhabdophis confusus is a keelback snake in the family Colubridae found in China.

References

Rhabdophis
Snakes of Southeast Asia
Reptiles of China
Endemic fauna of China
Reptiles described in 2021